There are several standards related to Unicode. Some are national standards that provide translated versions of sections of Unicode. Some provide guidance on using Unicode for languages frequently used in a region. Some are maintained to be in sync with Unicode.

References

Lunde, Ken. CJKV Information Processing.  Cambridge, Massachusetts: O'Reilly & Associates, 1998. . Page 120.
Has UCS been adopted as a national standard?

Unicode